The 2002 Laurence Olivier Awards were presented by the Society of London Theatre on 15 February 2002 at the Victoria Palace Theatre in London, celebrating excellence in West End theatre.  The ceremony was hosted by comedy writer and television presenter Clive Anderson.

Winners and nominees
Details of winners (in bold) and nominees, in each award category, per the Society of London Theatre.

{| class=wikitable width="100%"
|-
! width="50%" | Best New Play
! width="50%" | Outstanding Musical Production
|-
| valign="top" |
 Jitney by August Wilson – National Theatre Lyttelton Boy Gets Girl by Rebecca Gilman – Royal Court
 Gagarin Way by Gregory Burke – National Theatre Cottesloe
 Humble Boy by Charlotte Jones – National Theatre Cottesloe / Gielgud
 Mouth to Mouth by Kevin Elyot – Royal Court / Albery
| valign="top" |
 My Fair Lady – Theatre Royal Drury Lane
 Kiss Me, Kate – Victoria Palace
 South Pacific – National Theatre Olivier
|-
! width="50%" | Best New Comedy
! width="50%" | Best Entertainment
|-
| valign="top" |
 The Play What I Wrote by Eddie Braben, Sean Foley and Hamish McColl – Wyndham's Boston Marriage by David Mamet – Donmar Warehouse / New Ambassadors
 Caught in the Net by Ray Cooney – Vaudeville
 Feelgood by Alistair Beaton – Garrick
| valign="top" |
 Shockheaded Peter – Piccadilly / Albery Barbara Cook Sings Mostly Sondheim – Lyric
 The League of Gentlemen – Theatre Royal, Drury Lane
 The Pub Landlord: My Gaff, My Rules – Playhouse
 The Vagina Monologues – New Ambassadors / Arts
|-
! style="width="50%" | Best Actor
! style="width="50%" | Best Actress
|-
| valign="top" |
 Roger Allam as Terri Dennis in Privates on Parade – Donmar Warehouse Simon Russell Beale as Felix Humble in Humble Boy – National Theatre Cottesloe / Gielgud
 Sean Foley and Hamish McColl as Sean and Hamish in The Play What I Wrote – Wyndham's
 Alan Rickman as Elyot Chase in Private Lives – Albery
| valign="top" |
 Lindsay Duncan as Amanda Prynne in Private Lives – Albery Lindsay Duncan as Laura in Mouth to Mouth – Royal Court / Albery
 Victoria Hamilton as Sheila in A Day in the Death of Joe Egg – New Ambassadors / Comedy
 Zoë Wanamaker as Anna in Boston Marriage – Donmar Warehouse / New Ambassadors
|-
! style="width="50%" | Best Actor in a Musical or Entertainment
! style="width="50%" | Best Actress in a Musical or Entertainment
|-
| valign="top" |
 Philip Quast as Emile de Becque in South Pacific – National Theatre Olivier Brent Barrett as Fred Graham/Petruchio in Kiss Me, Kate – Victoria Palace
 Paul Keating as Straight Dave in Closer to Heaven – Arts
 Jonathan Pryce as Henry Higgins in My Fair Lady – Theatre Royal Drury Lane
| valign="top" |
 Martine McCutcheon as Eliza Doolittle in My Fair Lady – Theatre Royal Drury Lane Barbara Cook as Herself in Barbara Cook Sings Mostly Sondheim – Lyric
 Ruthie Henshall as Peggy Sue in Peggy Sue Got Married – Shaftesbury
 Marin Mazzie as Lilli Vanessi/Kate Minola in Kiss Me, Kate – Victoria Palace
|-
! style="width="50%" | Best Actor in a Supporting Role
! style="width="50%" | Best Actress in a Supporting Role
|-
| valign="top" |
 Toby Jones as Arthur in The Play What I Wrote – Wyndham's Desmond Barrit as Sir John Falstaff in Henry IV – Barbican
 Ned Beatty as Big Daddy Pollitt in Cat on a Hot Tin Roof – Lyric
 Adam Godley as Gompertz in Mouth to Mouth – Royal Court / Albery
 Malcolm Sinclair as Major Giles Flack in Privates on Parade – Donmar Warehouse
| valign="top" |
 Marcia Warren as Mercy Lott in Humble Boy – National Theatre Cottesloe / Gielgud Bríd Brennan as Birdie Hubbard in The Little Foxes – Donmar Warehouse
 Emma Fielding as Sibyl in Private Lives – Albery
 Lyndsey Marshal as Catherine in Boston Marriage – Donmar Warehouse / New Ambassadors
|-
! colspan=1 | Best Supporting Performance in a Musical or Entertainment
|-
|
 Martyn Jacques as Performer in Shockheaded Peter – Piccadilly / Albery Nancy Anderson as Lois Lane/Bianca Minola in Kiss Me, Kate – Victoria Palace
 Michael Berresse Bill Calhoun Lucentio in Kiss Me, Kate – Victoria Palace
 Nicholas Le Prevost as Colonel Hugh Pickering in My Fair Lady – Theatre Royal Drury Lane
|-
! style="width="50%" | Best Director
! style="width="50%" | Best Theatre Choreographer
|-
| valign="top" |
 Michael Boyd for Henry IV and Richard III – Young Vic Michael Blakemore for Kiss Me, Kate – Victoria Palace
 Howard Davies for Private Lives – Albery
 Julian Crouch and Phelim McDermott for Shockheaded Peter – Piccadilly / Albery
 Ian Rickson for Mouth to Mouth – Royal Court / Albery
| valign="top" |
 Matthew Bourne for My Fair Lady – Theatre Royal Drury Lane Irving Davies for The Play What I Wrote – Wyndham's
 Scarlett Mackmin for Privates on Parade – Donmar Warehouse
 Kathleen Marshall for Kiss Me, Kate – Victoria Palace
|-
! style="width="50%" | Most Promising Playwright
! style="width="50%" | Most Promising Performer
|-
| valign="top" |
 Grae Cleugh for Fucking Games – Royal Court Abi Morgan for Tender – Hampstead
 Simon Stephens for Herons – Royal Court
| valign="top" |
 Benjamin Davies as Danny in Fucking Games – Royal Court Jack Davenport as Tony in The Servant – Lyric Hammersmith
 Ralf Little as George Harrison in Presence – Royal Court
 Leah Muller as The Stepdaughter in Six Characters In Search of an Author – Young Vic
|-
! colspan=1 | Best Set Designer
! colspan=1 | Best Costume Designer
|-
| valign="top" |
 Tim Hatley for Humble Boy – National Theatre Cottesloe and Private Lives – Albery Lez Brotherston for A Midsummer Night's Dream – Albery and The Little Foxes – Donmar Warehouse
 Julian Crouch and Graeme Gilmour for Shockheaded Peter – Piccadilly / Albery
 Robin Wagner for Kiss Me, Kate – Victoria Palace
 Anthony Ward for My Fair Lady – Theatre Royal Drury Lane
| valign="top" |
 Jenny Beavan for Private Lives – Albery Martin Pakledinaz for Kiss Me, Kate – Victoria Palace
 Kevin Pollard for Shockheaded Peter – Piccadilly / Albery
 Anthony Ward for My Fair Lady – Theatre Royal Drury Lane
|-
! colspan=1 | Best Lighting Designer
|-
|
 Mark Henderson for A Midsummer Night's Dream – Albery and The Playboy of the Western World – National Theatre Cottesloe Howard Harrison for Cat on a Hot Tin Roof – Lyric and Tales from Hollywood – Donmar Warehouse
 David Hersey for My Fair Lady – Theatre Royal Drury Lane and South Pacific – National Theatre Olivier
 Tim Mitchell for Henry IV – Barbican
 Peter Mumford for Hamlet – Barbican and Private Lives – Albery
|-
! style="width="50%" | Outstanding Achievement in Dance
! style="width="50%" | Best New Dance Production
|-
| valign="top" |
 Mark Morris Dance Group for their season – Sadler's Wells Ushio Amagatsu for choreographing, conceiving, directing and performing Hibiki, Sankai Juku – Sadler's Wells
 Dana Caspersen in Artifact and Eidos/Telos, Ballett Frankfurt – Sadler's Wells
 William Forsythe in Artifact and Eidos/Telos, Ballett Frankfurt – Sadler's Wells
| valign="top" |
 Hibiki, Sankai Juku – Sadler's Wells Eidos/Telos, Ballett Frankfurt – Sadler's Wells
 Live, Dutch National Ballet – Sadler's Wells
 Onegin, The Royal Ballet – Royal Opera House
|-
! style="width="50%" | Outstanding Achievement in Opera
! style="width="50%" | Outstanding New Opera Production
|-
| valign="top" |
 Bernard Haitink for Jenůfa and The Queen of Spades, The Royal Opera – Royal Opera House From Morning to Midnight, The Rake's Progress, The Rape of Lucretia and War and Peace, English National Opera – London Coliseum
 Karita Mattila in Jenůfa and The Queen of Spades, The Royal Opera – Royal Opera House
 David Sawer for From Morning to Midnight, English National Opera – London Coliseum
| valign="top" |
 Boulevard Solitude, The Royal Opera – Royal Opera House Jenůfa, The Royal Opera – Royal Opera House
 The Rape of Lucretia, English National Opera – London Coliseum
 Rigoletto, The Royal Opera – Royal Opera House
|-
! colspan=1 | Outstanding Achievement Award
! colspan=1 | Audience Award for Most Popular Show
|-
| valign="top" |
 Trevor Nunn| valign="top" |
 The Phantom of the Opera – Her Majesty's All the Great Books (Abridged), Reduced Shakespeare Company – Criterion Theatre
 Cats – New London
 Mamma Mia – Prince Edward
|-
! colspan=1 | Society Special Award
|-
|
 Rupert Rhymes'|}

Productions with multiple nominations and awards
The following 23 productions, including three ballets and two operas, received multiple nominations:

 9: Kiss Me, Kate 8: My Fair Lady 7: Private Lives 5: Shockheaded Peter 4: Humble Boy, Mouth to Mouth and The Play What I Wrote 3: Boston Marriage, Eidos/Telos, Henry IV, Jenůfa, Privates on Parade and South Pacific 2: A Midsummer Night's Dream, Artifact, Barbara Cook Sings Mostly Sondheim, Cat on a Hot Tin Roof, From Morning to Midnight, Fucking Games, Hibiki, The Little Foxes, The Queen of Spades and The Rape of LucretiaThe following six productions received multiple awards:

 3: My Fair Lady and Private Lives 2: Fucking Games, Humble Boy, Shockheaded Peter and The Play What I Wrote''

See also
 56th Tony Awards

References

External links
 Previous Olivier Winners – 2002

Laurence Olivier Awards ceremonies
Laurence Olivier Awards, 2002
2002 in London
Laur